is a UK insolvency law case, concerning voidable transactions under what was the Fraudulent Conveyances Act 1571, and what is now the Insolvency Act 1986 section 423.

Facts
On Saturday morning Alderson (recorded as A.B. in the report) committed acts of bankruptcy. On Friday morning, Alderson had posted a £600 note from London to Temple, one of his creditors in Trowbridge, in return for two £300 notes. Temple’s two notes arrived on Monday. The assignees of Alderson brought an action for the value of the note. They argued, first, that the transfer of the note did not take effect merely by putting it in the post, and second, that it was an unlawful preference under the Fraudulent Conveyances Act 1571.

Judgment
Lord Mansfield CJ held the Fraudulent Conveyances Act 1571 applied, not just to fraudulent conveyances, but also the granting of fraudulent preferences, and Alderson's actions were void.

Yates J, Aston J and Willes J concurred.

See also

UK insolvency law

United Kingdom insolvency case law
1768 in case law
1768 in British law
Court of King's Bench (England) cases